Icing may refer to:

Science and technology
 Atmospheric icing, when water droplets freeze on objects they contact
 Icing (nautical), sea spray that freezes upon contact with ships
 Aufeis, or icing, a sheet-like mass of frozen groundwater

Sports
 Icing (ice hockey), an infraction
 Icing the kicker, a tactic in gridiron football

Other uses
 Icing (album), by Cherubs, 1992
 Icing (behavior), or ghosting, ending contact and communication without warning
 Icing (food), a sweet glaze made of sugar, usually on baked goods
 Icing (game), a drinking game and Internet meme
 Icing, a jewelry and accessories retailer owned by Claire's

See also
 Cryotherapy
 Ice
 Icing conditions, atmospheric conditions that can lead to icing on an aircraft
 Ising, a surname